Richard Woodruff (1784–1872) was a merchant and political figure in Upper Canada.

Richard Woodruff was born in New England in 1784 and came to the Niagara peninsula in Upper Canada, settling at St. Davids. He operated a mill there with his brother William. He served in the local militia during the War of 1812, becoming captain in 1835. In 1833, he was named justice of the peace in the Niagara District. Woodruff represented the 1st riding of Lincoln in the 13th Parliament of Upper Canada as a Reformer.

References 
Becoming Prominent: Leadership in Upper Canada, 1791-1841, J.K. Johnson (1989)

1784 births
1872 deaths
Members of the Legislative Assembly of Upper Canada
Canadian Methodists
Canadian justices of the peace
American emigrants to Canada